Maigret Sets a Trap (French: Maigret tend un piège) is a 1958 French-Italian crime film directed by Jean Delannoy and starring Jean Gabin, Annie Girardot and Olivier Hussenot. It is an adaptation of the novel Maigret Sets a Trap by Belgian writer Georges Simenon featuring his fictional detective Jules Maigret.

It was shot at the Epinay Studios in Paris and on location around the city. The film's sets were designed by the art director René Renoux.

Cast
 Jean Gabin as Jules Maigret
 Annie Girardot as Yvonne Maurin
 Olivier Hussenot as Lagrume
 Jeanne Boitel as Louise Maigret
 Lucienne Bogaert as Mme Veuve Adèle Maurin
 Jean Debucourt as Camille Guimard
 Guy Decomble as Mazet
 Paulette Dubost as Mauricette Barberot
 Jacques Hilling as Le médecin légiste
 Hubert de Lapparent as Le juge Coméliau
 Jean Desailly as Marcel Maurin
 Gérard Séty as Georges "Jojo" Vacher
 Lino Ventura as Inspector Torrence
 André Valmy as Inspector Lucas
 Nadine Basile as L'assistante de police

Critical reception
In The New York Times, Bosley Crowther wrote, "If you haven't yet made the acquaintance of French writer Georges Simenon and his famous and fascinating Parisian detective, Inspector Maigret, you can't ask a better introduction to both...an exciting example of the author's sophisticated work and a beautifully clear and catchy portrait of the gumshoe, performed by Jean Gabin...This is a don't-miss picture for the mystery fans."

References

External links

1958 crime films
1958 films
French crime films
1950s French-language films
Maigret films
Films directed by Jean Delannoy
Films set in Paris
Films shot in Paris
Films shot at Epinay Studios
Films with screenplays by Michel Audiard
Italian crime films
Police detective films
1950s police procedural films
1950s French films
1950s Italian films